Ruth Thomas (born 7 July 1967 in Horsmonden, Kent) is a British writer of novels and short stories.

Biography

Thomas studied English literature at the University of Edinburgh, then worked in various administrative jobs in the private and voluntary sector before turning to writing. Her first collection of short stories, Sea Monster Tattoo, was shortlisted for the John Llewellyn Rhys Prize and the Scottish Best First Book of the Year Award. Her second collection, The Dance Settee won a Scottish Arts Council Book Award. Both books were published by Polygon, which is now an imprint of Birlinn Limited.  Her first novel, Things to Make and Mend, was published in 2007 by Faber and won a Good Housekeeping Book Award (Most Entertaining Read).  Her latest collection of short stories, Super Girl, was published in 2009 also by Faber. Rock of Ages from that collection was runner up for the 2009 V. S. Pritchett memorial prize of the Royal Society of Literature. Her second novel, The Home Corner, was published in 2013.

Thomas lives in Edinburgh with her three children and husband, Mike Norman.

Works

Novels
Things to Make and Mend (2007), Faber & Faber
 Available as an audio book read by Finty Williams from BBC Audio Books
 Translated into Dutch as Vaardigheden Voor Meisjes by Inge de Heer for De Bezige Bij
The Home Corner (2013), Faber & Faber
The Snow and the Works on the Northern Line (2021),

Collections of short stories

Sea Monster Tattoo (1997) Polygon
The Dance Settee (1999) Polygon
Super Girl (2009) Faber & Faber

Ruth Thomas has been anthologised in collections since 1990. Her stories appear regularly on BBC Radio.

External links
 Ruth Thomas's Author page on the Faber & Faber website
 Ruth Thomas's agent - Jenny Brown - at Jenny Brown Associates
 'Letters from Moomin Valley' - Ruth Thomas writing on the Faber & Faber blog, The Thought Fox

References

1967 births
Living people
Scottish women novelists
Alumni of the University of Edinburgh
Scottish short story writers
20th-century British novelists
British women short story writers
20th-century British women writers
20th-century British short story writers
People from Horsmonden